Post is a surname of Low German and Dutch origin. It can be either toponymic (near a post, or marker) or occupational ("messenger; courier"). People with the name Post include:

Achim Post (born 1959), German politician
 (1839–1895), German jurist and judge
Albertson Van Zo Post (1866–1938), American fencer 
Alfred Post (1926–2013), German footballer
Alfred Charles Post (1806–1886), American surgeon
Alfred M. Post (1847–1923), Justice of the Nebraska Supreme Court 
Alise Post (born 1991), American bicycle motocross (BMX) racer
 (b. 1983), Norwegian winter triathlete 
Arthur Post (born 1959), American conductor
Amy Post (1802–1889), American abolitionist and women's rights activist
Anders Post Jacobsen (born 1985), Danish footballer
Austin Richard Post (born 1995), American rapper known as "Post Malone"
Bill Post (born 1950s), American radio personality and Oregon politician
C. W. Post (1854–1914), American foods manufacturer
Carole Post (fl. 2000s–2020s), American executive and information officer
Caroline Lathrop Post (1824–1915), American poet
Christian Frederick Post (1710–1785), Prussian-American Protestant missionary
Connie Post, American poet
Danny Post (born 1989), Dutch footballer
David Post (born c. 1950), American legal scholar
Dickie Post (born 1945), American football player
Don Post (1902–1979), American latex mask manufacturer
Ehrhardt Post (1881–1947), German chess master
Elisabeth Post (born 1965), Dutch politician
Elisabeth Maria Post (1755–1812), Dutch poet and author
Elizabeth Post (1920–2010), American etiquette writer, granddaughter of Emily Post
 (b. 1973), Dutch author and journalist
Emil Leon Post (1897–1954), Polish-American mathematician
Emily Post (1872–1960), American author on etiquette
Ethel Post-Parrish (died 1960), American Spiritualist medium
Florian Post (born 1981), German politician
Frank Post (born 1962), American BMX racer
Frans Post (1612–1680), Dutch painter
Glen Post (born 1952), American chief executive
George Adams Post (1854–1925), Congressman from Pennsylvania
George Booth Post (1906–1997). American watercolorist and art educator
George Browne Post (1837–1913), American architect
George Edward Post (1838–1909), American physician and botanist
George Morrison Post (1883–1966), American architect
Guy Bates Post (1875–1968), American character actor
Hafız Post (c. 1630 – 1694), Turkish composer and musician
Harry C. Post (1868–1961), American educator, founder of Post University
 (1904–1986), Dutch philologist
Henry Post (1885–1914), American aviation pioneer
Howard Post (1926–2010), American animator and comic artist
Isaac Post (1798–1872), American abolitionist and women's rights activist
Jacob Post (1774–1855), English Quaker and a religious writer
James D. Post (1863–1921), U.S. Representative from Ohio
James E. Post (born c. 1950), American business scholar
Jayden Post (born 1989), Australian rules footballer
Jermaine Post (born 1992), Dutch racing cyclist
Jim Post (born 1939), American folk musician
Johannes Post (1906–1944), Dutch Resistance member
Joop Post (born 1950), Dutch businessman and politician
Joseph Post (1906–1972), Australian conductor and music administrator
Jotham Post, Jr. (1771–1817), U.S. Representative from New York
Juliët Post (born 1997), Dutch cricketer
Keanau Post (born 1992), Canadian basketball player
Laura Post (born c. 1985), American voice actress
Leslee Milam Post, Arkansas politician
Lorenzo L. Post (1821–?), Wisconsin politician
Louise Post (born 1966), American rock singer and guitarist
Louis Freeland Post (1849–1928), prominent Georgist and Assistant United States Secretary of Labor
Lyman Post (1863–1933), American publisher and editor 
Madison Post (1815–1867), American mayor of Tampa, Florida
Marion Post (1910–1990), American photographer
Marjorie Merriweather Post (1887–1973), American socialite and founder of General Foods, Inc.
Mark Post (born 1957), Dutch pharmacologist
Markie Post (1950–2021), American actress
Marten Post (born 1942), Dutch visual artist 
Mary Post (1841–1934), American education pioneer
Maurice Post (fl. 1906), American college football coach
Maurice E. Post (1881–1958), Michigan politician
Maurits Post (1645–1677), Dutch architect 
Melville Davisson Post (1871–1930), American mystery author
Meredith Post, American television writer
Mike Post (born 1944), American composer and music producer
Mike Post (born 1944), British airline pilot, pension campaigner
Mikey Post (born c. 1990), American actor
Morton Everel Post (1840–1933), American politician
Nathan Post (1881–1938), 7th and 10th Governor of American Samoa
Peggy Post (born 1945), American etiquette writer
Peter Post (1933–2011), Dutch cyclist and directeur sportif
Philip S. Post (1833–1895), American diplomat, politician, and Army officer
Pieter Post (1608–1669), Dutch architect, painter and printmaker
Randy Post (born 1968), American illustrator
Regis Henri Post (1870–1944), New York politician and Governor of Puerto Rico
Reuben Post (1792–1858), American Presbyterian clergyman
Richard F. Post (1918–2015), American physicist 
Robert Post (born 1979), Norwegian singer/songwriter
Robert C. Post (born 1947), American law professor 
Robert P. Post (1910–1943), American war correspondent
Sam Post (1896–1971), American baseball player
Sander Post (born 1984), Estonian footballer
Sandra Post (born 1948), Canadian golfer
Saskia Post (born 1961), American-born Australian actress
Seraphim Post (1904–1975), American football player
Siim-Markus Post (born 1997), Estonian basketball player
Soraya Post (born 1956), Swedish politician
Stephen Post (1810–1879), American Latter Day Saint leader
Stephen G. Post (born 1951), American ethicist
Steve Post (1944–2014), American freeform radio artist
Sue-Ann Post (born 1964), Australian comedian and writer
Suzy Post (born 1933), American civil rights activist
Ted Post (1918–2013), American television and film director
Troy Victor Post (1906–1998), American insurance executive
Wally Post (1929–1982), Major League Baseball outfielder
Walter A. Post (died 1912), first mayor of Newport News, Virginia
Wiley Post (1898–1935), American aviator; first pilot to fly solo around the world
William Post (1939–2006), American lottery winner 
 (1857–1921), American photographer
Wright Post (1766–1828), American surgeon
Van der Post
Laurens van der Post (1906–1996), South African author
Von Post
Gunilla von Post (1932–2011), Swedish aristocrat and Kennedy friend
 (1822–1911), Swedish geologist and agricultural scientist
Lennart von Post (1884–1951), Swedish naturalist and geologist
Vicken von Post Totten (1886–1950), Swedish ceramicist, sculptor, painter, and illustrator

Fictional characters
Johnny Post, from the American television series Oz
Wilber and Carol Post, from the American television series Mister Ed

References

See also
 Post (disambiguation)
 Poste (disambiguation)

Dutch-language surnames
Low German surnames
Estonian-language surnames